Panj District (Nohiyai Panj) is a district in Khatlon Region, Tajikistan. Its capital is Panj. The population of the district is 119,700 (January 2020 estimate). The district has been an area of ethnic tensions betweek its Uzbek and Tajik residents. During the early Soviet period the district was officially named Kirovobod District.

Administrative divisions
They are as follows:

References

Districts of Khatlon Region
Districts of Tajikistan